Seltinsky District (Śölta joros) is an administrative and municipal district (raion), one of the twenty-five in the Udmurt Republic, Russia. It is located in the west of the republic. Its administrative center is the rural locality (a selo) of Selty. Population:  13,335 (2002 Census);  The population of Selty accounts for 46.4% of the district's total population.

References

Sources

Districts of Udmurtia